The Sangamon class were a group of four escort aircraft carriers of the United States Navy that served during World War II.

Overview
These ships were originally  oilers, launched in 1939 for civilian use. They were acquired and commissioned by the U.S. Navy in 1940–1941. Due to the shortage of MARAD type C3 ships for conversion to desperately needed escort carriers, it was decided in early 1942 to convert four oilers to escort carriers. The conversion took around six months.

These ships were the largest escort carrier conversions built for the U.S. Navy. The late-war s were about as large, but were built as carriers from keel up. Being built as T3 tanker oilers, the machinery space was located aft, resulting in the placing of the smokestacks on both sides aft of the flight deck. They were excellent examples of the type, roomy and tough with a large flight deck and good stability on even high seas. The Sangamons could operate about 30 aircraft, and were the only escort carriers to operate dive bombers.

The Sangamon class were all renamed for rivers following the contemporary U.S. Navy practice for oilers when taken into naval service and retained those names following their conversions to carriers.

Service history
From late 1942 until the end of the war the ships saw active duty in the Mediterranean, Atlantic and Pacific Campaigns. Three of the class were damaged by Japanese kamikaze attacks at the Battle of Leyte Gulf, but all survived the war. In the Pacific, the carriers often operated together as Carrier Division 22.

The ships were withdrawn from active service shortly after the end of the war. Some of them were kept in reserve and reclassified as helicopter escort carriers (CVHE). All had been sold or scrapped by the early 1960s.

Ships

See also

List of ship classes of the Second World War
List of aircraft carriers

Notes

References 

 
 

Escort aircraft carrier classes
 
 Sangamon-class escort carriers
 Sangamon-class escort carriers